George Leybourne (17 March 1842 – 15 September 1884) was a Lion comique of the British Victorian music hall who, for much of his career, was known by the title of one of his songs, "Champagne Charlie". Another of his songs, and one that can still be heard today, is "The Daring Young Man on the Flying Trapeze". His 1867 hit "Champagne Charlie" led to the first major success of the music hall concept in Britain, and he remains among the best known music hall performers.

Early life
George Leybourne was born Joseph Saunders in Gateshead; however, at an early age he and his family moved to live in London. Before he went on the music halls he worked as an engineer in, amongst other places, the South West England. For his early music hall appearances in the Northern England, including Liverpool and Newcastle he used his real name - Joe Saunders - a fact which, in the past, caused much confusion as to his real name. His first documented appearance in London using the stage-name George Leybourne was at the Bedford Music Hall in 1863, but it is known that he had appeared in some of the smaller East-End venues in the months before this.

Career

In 1866 with composer Alfred Lee, he wrote "Champagne Charlie", premiering it in Leeds in the August of that year. It took several months before it became the hit song. Another of Leybourne's major song successes, also dating from 1866, was "The Flying Trapeze", music by Alfred Lee. The song reflected a fascination with trapeze artistes then performing in the UK, including Jules Léotard who had appeared in the Alhambra Music Hall in London. In 1867 it was published in the United States by C. H. Ditson & Co, with music attributed to Gaston Lyle.

In the 1860s, Leybourne, along with several contemporaries including Arthur Lloyd and Alfred Peck Stevens developed a new type of music hall artiste, the Lion Comique; a swell or attractive, fashionable, young man. In this style, performers relied less on copying burlesque, and instead sought inspiration in their everyday experiences and the colourful characters of daily street life. Audiences loved to join in the chorus and "give the bird." In some of his songs he appeared immaculately dressed in white tie and tails, when he would declare his love for the high life, women, and champagne. However, he also earned a reputation for his many character songs, which were detailed studies of people from across class lines.

In 1868, when William Holland became manager of the Canterbury Music Hall, he employed Leybourne on an exclusive contract of £25 a week, providing him with a carriage drawn by four white horses. Over the next year by appearing, with Holland's permission, at several other halls at the same time, his salary rose to £120 per week.

Leybourne also wrote the lyrics to the 1871 song "If Ever I Cease to Love", some of the lyrics of which caused a scandal. Today it is remembered for its association with Mardi Gras in New Orleans; it became the signature song for the Rex Krewe.

The song was sung by Lydia Thompson, in the burlesque adaptation of Offenbach's operetta Bluebeard, with which she was touring the United States. When he visited New Orleans in 1872, Russian Grand Duke Alexei Romanov saw Bluebeard and was fascinated by both the singer and the song.

When Jenny Hill performed at the London Pavilion, she stopped the show and forced Leybourne to wait for her act to finish, after which he carried her back for an encore.

Leybourne and Alfred Vance, also known as The Great Vance, have historically been viewed as rivals in popular culture, an understanding amplified by the 1944 film Champagne Charlie. Latest research shows that while they both sang songs extolling the virtues of various alcoholic drinks, their careers took slightly different paths. Leybourne concentrated on his music hall appearances, while Vance entertained middle-class audiences with 'safe' concert party shows. It was in their advertisements that the rivalry came to the fore. In the film Champagne Charlie Leybourne was played by comedian Tommy Trinder, while Alfred Vance was played by Stanley Holloway.

Death and legacy

During a career spanning 23 years Leybourne sang over 200 songs; however, towards the end of his career he failed to adapt to the changing times and his popularity declined. He died penniless in Islington aged 42.

Leybourne is buried at Abney Park Cemetery in Stoke Newington, London with his actress daughter Florence Leybourne, her husband, the music hall star Albert Chevalier and grandson Frederick. His headstone, with the epitaph "God's finger touched him and he slept", was erected by fellow music hall entertainer Dan Leno, and the Grand Order of Water Rats. George Leybourne's grave is cared for by The Music Hall Guild of Great Britain and America.

Leybourne appeared at Wilton's Music Hall in London's East End, the world's oldest surviving grand music hall, and an adjoining modern residential apartment block has been named "George Leybourne House" after him.

References

External links

 Derek B Scott sings “Champagne Charlie” (1867)
 Biography of George Leybourne by Christopher Beeching, published DCG Publications 2011
 Victoria and Albert Museum; "George Leybourne"; London; 2016
 London Remembers: "Plaque: George Leybourne"
 IMDb: "George Leybourne" film soundtrack music.

1842 births
1884 deaths
19th-century British male singers
Burials at Abney Park Cemetery
English songwriters
Music hall performers
Singers from London
British male songwriters